Mikhail Anatolyevich Taratuta (born 2 June 1948, Moscow) is a Russian journalist, analyst and chronicler of American life. Author and presenter of the popular TV program America with Mikhail Taratuta.

Biography

Mikhail Taratuta was born on 2 June 1948 in Moscow. In 1972 he graduated from Moscow State Linguistic University on the specialty of a translator-referent (with knowledge of English and Swedish).

In 1970, while still a student, he was sent to Egypt, where he was an interpreter of the Soviet military adviser. In 1972 (after graduation) he was drafted into the army, becoming an officer-interpreter in Bangladesh. Since 1974, Mikhail worked for the International broadcasting.

From 1988 to 2000, Mikhail Taratuta was in the United States, where he was first a correspondent of the program Vremya, and then the author of the program America with Mikhail Taratuta. In total they included about 1000 reports about the United States.

Since 2000, Mikhail Taratuta has worked in Russia, mainly in the production of documentary films and autobiographical books. In addition, for some time on NTV, and then on the Russia Сhannel came out the author's program Taratuta  Russian Hills. 2002–2011 – President of the MITACOM Foundation (Producer Center).

Since 2016 he has been taking part in the social and political talk show 60 Minutes on the channel Russia-1.

Family 
 Wife –  Marina, lawyer (corporate and family law)
 Daughter  – Ekaterina Taratuta, script writer, translator, journalist
 Son-in-law –  Vladislav Druzhinin, director
 Brother  – Emelyan Zakharov, businessman

Bibliography 
 1985 – Soviet Democracy: A Discussion
 2004 – America with Mikhail Taratuta
 2006 – American Chronicles, or Introduction to Capitalism

References

External links
 Михаил Таратута: В нынешнее ТВ я бы не вписался
 Тема с журналистом Михаилом Таратутой

1948 births
Living people
Journalists from Moscow
Soviet journalists
Russian television presenters